Sir James Beveridge Thomson, KBE, SMN, PMN, PJK (24 March 1902 – 31 March 1983), was a Scottish jurist and barrister who was the Chief Justice of the Federal Court of Malaysia. He was also Chief Justice of Fiji.

Life
Born in Clydebank, Scotland, he attended George Watson's College and graduated from the University of Edinburgh with first class honours in history.

He was called to the English Bar (Middle Temple) in 1929. He was a resident magistrate in Northern Rhodesia, appointed Puisne Judge, Fiji and Western Pacific, in 1945, and Puisne Judge in Malaya in 1947. He was Chief Justice of Fiji (and ex officio Chief Judicial Commissioner for the Western Pacific) 1949–1953, and Chief Justice of Tonga. He was called to the Scottish Bar in 1955.

From 1953, Thomson was back in Malaya. He was a judge in the High Court in Ipoh, Perak, from 1953 to 1957. In 1957, he was appointed as Chief Justice of Malaya, receiving a knighthood in 1959. After the formation of Malaysia in September 1963, Thomson served as its first Lord President of the Federal Court until May 1966. He was appointed KBE in 1966.

Family life

He married Dr Florence Adams, MRCP (Eng.), LRCP (Lond.). After Sir James Thomson's knighthood in 1959, she was known as Toh Puan Datin Lady Florence Adams Thomson. She was a practising physician, working in Northern Rhodesia, where her husband was Resident Magistrate, and was Medical Officer in Fiji. During their time in Malaysia, she became chief nutritionist at the Institute of Medical Research in Kuala Lumpur, carrying out research and authoring a number of articles on child nutrition in Malaysia.
 When in Scotland, and after their retirement, they lived at Craig Gowan, Carrbridge, Badenoch and Strathspey, Highland region (formerly Inverness-shire).

Honours

Commonwealth honours
  : 
 Honorary Commander of the Order of the Defender of the Realm (P.M.N.(K)) - Tan Sri (1958)
  : 
 Honorary Grand Commander of the Order of the Defender of the Realm (S.M.N.(K)) - Tun (1966)

 Knight Commander of the Order of the British Empire (KBE) - Sir (1966)

Selected bibliography

Notes

References

External links
Photo of Sir James Thomson as first Lord President of the Malaysian Federal Court
Malaysian granny with child: photo by Dr. F. Adam Thomson, The Straits Times, 17 November 1950, Page 6

1902 births
1983 deaths
Alumni of the University of Edinburgh
Chief justices of Malaysia
Knights Commander of the Order of the British Empire
People from Clydebank
Chief justices of Tonga
Chief justices of Fiji
Colony of Fiji judges
Scottish expatriates in Fiji
British expatriates in Zambia
Chief judicial commissioners for the Western Pacific
Northern Rhodesia judges
British Malaya judges
Kingdom of Tonga (1900–1970) judges
20th-century Scottish lawyers
Scottish barristers
Honorary Commanders of the Order of the Defender of the Realm
Honorary Grand Commanders of the Order of the Defender of the Realm